Reichshof is a North Rhine-Westphalian municipality in the Oberbergischer Kreis in Germany, about 40 km east of Cologne. It is a health resort, known for its good climate.

History
While sources on the early history of the area are scarce,  suggests it was first founded during the reign of Charlemagne. It was first officially mentioned on August 1, 1167, when it was granted as a gift by Friedrich I (Barbarossa) to Archbishop Rainald of Cologne.

As a consequence of the municipal reorganization of 1969, the formerly independent municipalities Denklingen and Eckenhagen were consolidated into the municipality of Reichshof. The management of the municipality of Reichshof takes place in Denklingen.

Demographics

Features of interest
The area has swimming pools and various sporting facilities (tennis, horse racing, shooting galleries, a gymnasium and a bicycle park). There are also several elementary schools.

The Denklingen Railway Bridge is a protected heritage site, part of the Wiehl Valley Railway (Wiehltalbahn). Various museums, churches and parks are open to visitors, along with historic mills and Denklingen Castle.

Companies in the new industrial area of Wehnrat include Ralf Bohle GmbH, producers of Schwalbe bicycle tires, SCEMTEC Transponder Technology GmbH, and Stahlbau GmbH (textiles).

Twin towns
 Roden (since 2001 Noordenveld), Netherlands (since 1963)

References

External links

 official homepage municipality Reichshof

Oberbergischer Kreis